Charles Harold Loeb (April 2, 1905 – August 21, 1978) was an American journalist known for exposing the truth about radiation casualties from the Hiroshima bomb. Loeb's article reporting on World War II was published in multiple newspapers with support of the National Newspaper Publishers Association (known then as the National Negro Publishers Association, or NNPA). Loeb served multiple terms as chairman of the Editorial Society for the NNPA.

Career

Cleveland Call and Post 
Loeb joined the Cleveland Call and Post in 1933, working his way up through various positions until he became a managing editor. He eventually became known as the "dean of black newsmen".

World War II 
One of Loeb's most significant works was an article originally published in the Atlanta Daily World titled "Loeb Reflects On Atomic Bombed Area" in which he contradicted existing coverage of the bombing of Hiroshima at the end of the war. Loeb's description of the injury and suffering caused by radiation from the bombings went into greater detail than coverage in major outlets at the time, including The New York Times. The report was more descriptive of the structural damage of the bomb blast, but briefly described the effect of radiation poisoning, despite reports about human suffering being censored by the U.S. military.

Personal life 
Charles H. Loeb was born in Baton Rouge, Louisiana. He was married to Beulah Loeb. Their daughter, Stella Loeb-Munson stated that Charles Loeb had been "haunted" by memories of what he had seen in the aftermath of the bombings. Loeb died on August 21, 1978.

References 

1905 births
1978 deaths
African-American journalists
American editors
20th-century African-American people